Erika Lyn Lawler (born February 5, 1987) is a member of the 2009–10 United States national women's ice hockey team which participated in the 2010 Olympic Winter Games. Lawler played prep hockey at Cushing Academy where she won the Bette Davis Award as the top athlete in her class three times.  She then played collegiately for the Wisconsin Badgers of the Western Collegiate Hockey Association and won three NCAA titles (2006, 2007 and 2009).

Playing career

Wisconsin Badgers

Won 3 NCAA titles in Four Seasons
Played in 163 career games, the most in school history
Ranks 7th for career Goals with 55
Ranked 2nd in career Assists with 119 and 2nd for most assists in a season with 44
Ranks 3rd all time in Points at UW with 174 and 4th in season points with 64
Holds UW Record for most assists in a Period and most assists in a single game
In 28 post season games played compiled 14 goals and 18 assists for 32 points most in history
Academic All WCHA Honors
Captained the Badgers as a Senior

(2008–09):
Captained the Badgers to the 2009 NCAA National Championship
Led the NCAA with 44 assists
Named Beyond the Dashers National Player of the Year
Earned All-WCHA Second Team honors
Top-10 finalist for the Patty Kazmaier Memorial Award.
Lawler received the Badger Award for being the most inspiring player on her UW team
Played in 40 of 41 games

(2007–08):
Helped the Badgers to the NCAA title game
Led the team with 28 assists and ranked third with 40 points
tied for third on the team in points (38) and sixth in goals (11)
Ranked fourth in the WCHA with 21 assists in conference games
Her 27 assists tied her for 11th in the country
Tied for the team-lead with four multi-assist games
Ranks fourth on the team with 10 multi-point games
Played in all 41 games
Lawler received the Badger Award for being the most inspiring player on her UW team
All-WCHA Second Team honoree

(2006–07):
Helped lead the team to the NCAA National Championship for the second consecutive year
Led all UW sophomores with 38 points
Third on the team with 13 multi-point games
Recorded seven multi-assist games and one multi-goal game
Tied for 14th in the nation with 28 assists
Played in all 41 games
All-WCHA Third Team selection

(2005–06):
Sixth in team scoring with 13 Goals, 19 Assists and 32 Points
15th Badger ever to have more than 30 points in a season
Played in all 41 games
Helped the Badgers win the NCAA title

USA Hockey
Three-time member of the United States Women's National Team for the
International Ice Hockey Federation World Women's Championship (gold-2008-09, silver-
2007) … Four-time member of the United States Women's Select Team for the Four Nations Cup
(1st-2008, 2nd-2006-07, 2009) … Member of the United States Women's National Team in 2009–
10 (Qwest Tour) … Three-time member of the United States Women's Under-22 Select Team for the
Under-22 Series with Canada (2006–08). Cocaptained the team in 2008 … Four-time USA
Hockey Women's National Festival participant (2006–09) … Four-time USA Hockey Player
Development Camp attendee (2002–05).

2010 Olympic team
Received Silver Medal in the XXI 2010 Winter Olympics in Vancouver. Erika and the USA Women's Hockey Team lost 2–0 against Canada on February 25, 2010.

Awards and honors
USA Hockey
Three-time member of the U.S. Women's National Team for the International Ice Hockey Federation World Women's Championship (gold-2008-09, silver-2007) ... Three-time member of the U.S. Women's Select Team for the Four Nations Cup (1st-2008, 2nd-2006-07) ... Three-time member of the U.S. Women's Under-22 Select Team for the Under-22 Series with Canada (2006–08). Co-captained the team in 2008 ... Four-time USA Hockey Women's National Festival participant (2006–09) ... Four-time USA Hockey Player Development Camp attendee (2002–05).

College Played four seasons at the University of Wisconsin of the Western Collegiate Hockey Association, where she was part of three national championship teams ... Her 174 career points (55–119) rank third in school history. As a Senior (2008–09): Captained the Badgers to the 2009 NCAA National Championship ... Led the NCAA with 44 assists ... Earned All-WCHA Second Team honors ... Top-10 finalist for the Patty Kazmaier Memorial Award. As a Junior (2007–08): Helped the Badgers to the NCAA title game ... Led the team with 28 assists and ranked third with 40 points ... All-WCHA Second Team honoree. As a Sophomore (2006–07): Helped lead the team to the NCAA National Championship for the second consecutive year ... All-WCHA Third Team selection. As a Freshman (2005–06): Helped the Badgers win the NCAA title.

 2008 Badger Award
 Led the NCAA with 44 assists in 2009

References

External links
On The Ellen DeGeneres Show

1987 births
American women's ice hockey forwards
Ice hockey players from Massachusetts
Ice hockey players at the 2010 Winter Olympics
Living people
Medalists at the 2010 Winter Olympics
Olympic silver medalists for the United States in ice hockey
Sportspeople from Fitchburg, Massachusetts
Wisconsin Badgers women's ice hockey players